Hinojosas de Calatrava is a municipality in Ciudad Real, Castile-La Mancha, Spain. It has a population of 722.

External links 
 Hinojosas de Calatrava Town web

Municipalities in the Province of Ciudad Real